Keerampara is an Indian village in the state of Kerala, India.  This is a junction. This place is once blessed with the footprints of all the holy personnel who passed through the Royal route (from Madurai to Kothamangalam).

History 
The name itself signifies its contacts with the western countries from time immemorial. This part of the country has names tagged with "para". Contrary to general belief this does not signify a rock. "Para" in the Thracian language means a "village" and thereby Keeram + para makes Keerampara = The Village of Parrots. Similarly Oonjappara becomes the Village of Swings. The Thracians had a very good influence in India before the birth of christ especially in the Ernakulam district due to the trade links with ancient Kodungalloor Musris.

The Keerampara Panchayat is encompassed with many historical locations like the Cheramala, believed to be the summer palace of erstwhile Chera kings; Kalappara, the sword fighting ground of Kings; Ayyappanmudi, the serene temple at the hill top, the royal route of Alwaye-Madura passes through this place. It was formed 1 August 1953 and its first president was the late Sri. Joseph G Chelad.

Geography
Keerampara is a village ensconced at the eastern range of Ernakulam district in Kerala.
Kothamangalam was known in old days as Malakhachira. 
The total population is 15,000 with a population density of 522 persons/km2 (200 people per sq. miles.)

The Chera capital is in its immediate vicinity.

Climate
Two predominant seasons are experienced there: Summer and Rainy season. The maximum temperature reaches about 25 °C (77 °F). Rainfall is about 2,500 mm (98 in) per year. Winter season is moderate there during December and January.

Education
Keerampara has one higher secondary school (st stephen higher secondary school ) and two high schools (st stephen high school )
St.Joseph's high school, Velielchal.

How to reach Keerampara 

The holy Trikkariyur temple is only  from Keerampara. The holy Mar Thoma Cheria pally is 6 km from this place.
Keerampara Panchayat contributes mainly to the parish of St.Stephen's Beth Aniyo Valiapalli, Chelad.

Places of tourist interests 
Periyar river for boat cruise; Thattekkad
Salim Ali Bird sanctuary Thattakkad, a protected area for Tropical forest birds
Cheramala a historical place
Ayyappan mudi (mountain),a trekking destination
Nadukani mudi, a trekking cum Catholic religious destination

Inchathotti hanging bridge.
Palamattam Kaalakadavu echo point.

References 

Villages in Ernakulam district